Jeon Su-ji (born 10 November 1983) is a South Korean actress. She is known for her roles in dramas such as Designated Survivor: 60 Days, Signal, Sin Don and Green Mothers' Club. She also appeared in movies Marathon, Closer to heaven, Radio Dayz, Emergency Declaration and The Terror Live.

Filmography

Television series

Film

Theatre

Awards and nominations

References

External links 
 
 

1983 births
Living people
21st-century South Korean actresses
South Korean television actresses
South Korean film actresses